Arthur Hudson (1882–1973) was a rugby union international who represented England from 1906 to 1910.

Early life
Arthur Hudson was born on 27 October 1882 in Gloucester.

Rugby union career
Hudson made his international debut on 13 January 1906 at Athletic Ground, Richmond in the England vs Wales match.
Of the 8 matches he played for his national side he was on the winning side on 4 occasions.
He played his final match for England on 3 March 1910 at Parc des Princes in the France vs England match.

International try record

Source for information in table below: Profile of Arthur Hudson at ESPN Scrum.com

References

1882 births
1973 deaths
English rugby union players
England international rugby union players
Rugby union players from Gloucester
Rugby union wings